William J. Cason (October 1, 1924 – January 4, 2017) was an American politician who served in the Missouri State Senate. He was born in Higginsville, Missouri and attended the University of Missouri in Columbia, studying law (LLB 1951). Cason was admitted to the Missouri bar in 1951. He served in the Missouri State Senate for the 31st district (Henry County) from 1960 to 1976. He was a member of the Democratic party.

Issues in state senate
 Civil rights
 Environmental protection
 Women's rights

References

1924 births
2017 deaths
People from Higginsville, Missouri
Missouri lawyers
University of Missouri alumni
Democratic Party Missouri state senators
People from Clinton, Missouri
20th-century American lawyers